Gushan-e Bala (also Romanized as Gūshān-e Bālā; also known as Gūshān) is a village in Eskelabad Rural District, Nukabad District, Khash County, Sistan and Baluchestan Province, Iran. At the 2006 census, its population was 58, in 8 families.

References 

Populated places in Khash County